Journey to work is data collected as part of a census that describes aspects of commuting behaviour. Travel behaviour surveys may also describe commuting habits, but this is rarely considered to be a journey to work.

Data collected includes the mode (or modes) used by an individual to travel from home to work, and may also include the time that it takes to do so or the workplace location.

Data collection by country

In the United States, journey-to-work data is collected by the United States Census every ten years. Data includes the mode and the time it takes to travel to the workplace.
In the United Kingdom the term used is travel to work areas. Travel to work areas are derived based on information gathered via a census every ten years.
In Australia, journey-to-work data is collected by census every five years. Data includes the mode and workplace location.
Many developed countries carry out similar surveys to assist with transportation planning.

See also 
 Commuting
 Roadway air dispersion modeling
 Roadway noise
 Traffic congestion

External links 
Australian Bureau of Statistics, Journey To Work question for 2011 Census
Census Journey to Work Data for 50 largest US Metro Areas in 1990
Map issued in 2006 of principal Travel-to-Work Areas in the UK, derived from 2001 Census data
A site that documents different peoples journey's to work throughout the world

Transportation planning